Babacar Touré (1 July 1951 – 26 July 2020) was a Senegalese businessman and journalist.

Biography
Touré obtained a master's degree in political science, journalism, and communication, as well as one in English. He graduated from the Centre d'études des sciences et techniques de l'information (CESTI) in 1979.

Touré began working for Le Soleil before earning a scholarship to study in the United States. He then studied at the Université du Québec à Montréal, Michigan State University, and University of Kansas. Upon his return to Senegal, he began working for Enda Tiers-monde, an NGO.

In 1986, Touré co-founded Sud hebdo, which became Sud Quotidien in 1993. He then began leading Sud Communication, a group that began Sud FM, Senegal's first private radio station. He was also a founding member of the Syndicat Professionnels Information Communication Sénégal (SYNPICS).

He was a member of the Social and Economic Council of Senegal, the Midwest Sociological Society, the National Democratic Institute, and the Panos Network. In 2012, Touré was appointed President of the Conseil National de Régulation de l'Audiovisuel.

Babacar Touré died on 26 July 2020 in Dakar.

References

1951 births
2020 deaths
Senegalese people